A sweetheart cake or wife cake or marriage pie is a traditional Chinese cake with a thin crust of flaky pastry, and made with a filling of winter melon, almond paste, and sesame, and spiced with five spice powder.
"Wife cake" is the translation of lou po beng from Cantonese, and although the meaning is "wife", the literal translation is "old lady cake", paralleling the colloquial usage of "old lady" for "wife" in American English. In Hong Kong, it is known as a specialty of Yuen Long.

Variants
The traditional variant is from Guangdong province, where the filling consists of candied wintermelon. The candied wintermelon mash is then combined with white sesame seeds and glutinous rice flour.  Coconut in the form of mash or desiccated shreds and almond paste, as well as vanilla, are also added sometimes. The paste is encased in Cantonese-style pastry dough; the authentic flavour and flaky texture of the pastry is traditionally produced by using pork lard shortening then by glazing with egg wash. Due to its rising popularity in Western countries brought about by immigration, butter is sometimes substituted in place of lard, though this will alter the taste. The level of sweetness is mild, compared to Western sweet pastries.

Southeast Asian variations can include spices such as Chinese five spice (五香粉). Although this spice is of Chinese origin, it is not traditionally used in sweetheart cakes. Sweetheart cake may be confused with the husband cake (老公饼 or Lao gong bing), which uses star anise in its filling.

Legends of origin
There are many legends that attempt to explain the origins of the sweetheart cake.  One tells the tale of a couple that lived a very poor life in imperial China.  They loved each other and lived in a small village. Suddenly, a mysterious disease spread and the husband's father became very sick.  The couple spent all of their money in order to treat the man's father.  The wife sold herself as a slave in exchange for money to buy medicine for her father-in-law. Once the husband learned about what his wife did, he made a cake filled with sweetened wintermelon and almond. He dedicated this pastry to his wife whom he could never forget, and sold it on the street. His cake became so popular that he was able to earn enough money to buy his wife back.

There is another version where the man went searching for his wife after he earned enough money to buy her back. In his search, he had a cup of tea at a local teahouse, when he suddenly recognised the pastry they were serving with the tea. The man and his wife were reunited at the teahouse.

Another story tells of a dim sum chef's wife creating a pastry with wintermelon paste influenced by a recipe from her mother's family. The new pastry was found to taste better than the dim sums that were being sold in teahouses, and the chef proudly told everyone it was made by his wife, hence it was named "Wife Cake".

See also
 Chinese bakery products
 List of Chinese desserts
 List of desserts
 List of melon dishes
 List of pastries
 Marry girl cake

References

Chinese desserts
Hong Kong cuisine
Melon dishes
Yuen Long